Camaragibe (population 156,736) is a city in northeastern Brazil, in the State of Pernambuco. It lies near Recife at 8.00° South, 35.04° West.

Currently, Camaragibe is run by Nadegi Queiroz (from the political party Republicans) and Délio Junior (The Vice-mayor).

The lands now belonging to the city were used as a reserve of wood, and then for sugar planting. It was populated by natives, until the arrival of Portuguese with Duarte Coelho Pereira, around 1500. After the Portuguese arrival, however, the natives were not completely driven from the area. Instead, they lived "peacefully" with the invaders.

In the 16th century the city (then just an engenho) was considered one of richest in the region until the Dutch invasion in 1645. At that time, the farm was burned to the ground by the natives.

On 13 May 1982, Camaragibe, which was then part of the bigger city São Lourenço da Mata, was elevated to the category of city.

The small city is considered among the most densely populated urban areas in the world because of the very accelerated growth that the city experienced from the emancipation until now.

Geography

 State - Pernambuco
 Region - RMR (Recife)
 Boundaries - Paulista (N), Sao Lourenco da Mata (S), Paudalho (W), Recife (E)
 Area - 55.08 km2
 Elevation - 55 m
 Hydrography - Capibaribe and Beberibe rivers
 Vegetation - Hidrofila, capoeirao, capoeira, and sugarcane plantation
 Climate - Hot tropical and humid
 Annual average temperature - 25.1 °C 
 Main road - PE 005
 Distance to Recife - 16 km

Economy

The main economic activities in Camaragibe are based in commerce and general industry. Also is a main and terminal stop in the metropolitan train (subway or tube system), with integration with local bus lanes.

Economic Indicators

Economy by Sector
2006

Health Indicators

Notable people
Hélio José Muniz Filho, Brazilian criminal suspected of killing 65 people

References

 
1982 establishments in Brazil
Populated places established in 1982
Municipalities in Pernambuco